This is a list of diplomatic missions of Vietnam. The first overseas presence of the Democratic Republic of Vietnam (the antecedent to the Socialist Republic of Vietnam) was a representative office in Paris, approximately during the period of the Fontainebleau Conference in 1946–1947.  There was later a representative office operating in Bangkok from 1948, although it was closed in 1951 when the Thai government recognised the Republic of Vietnam.  The Democratic Republic of Vietnam's first embassy was opened in Beijing in 1950, followed by Moscow in 1952, and consulates in Nanning, Kunming, and Guangzhou opening shortly afterwards.  In 1964 the DRV had opened 19 diplomatic missions abroad; six years later this number increased to 30.

The Republic of Vietnam, more commonly known as "South Vietnam", also had its own separate diplomatic network until the fall of Saigon in 1975.

Honorary consulates and trade missions (with the exception of the Vietnam Economic and Culture Office in Taipei) are omitted from this listing.

Current missions

Africa

Americas

Asia

Europe

Oceania

Multilateral organisations

Closed missions

Africa

Americas

Asia

Europe

Missions to reopen 
 
 Tripoli (Embassy)

Future Missions 

 Dublin (Embassy)

See also 
 Foreign relations of Vietnam
 List of diplomatic missions in Vietnam
 Visa policy of Vietnam

References

External links 
 Ministry of Foreign Affairs of Vietnam
 Vietnamese Diplomatic Missions

 
Vietnam
Diplomatic missions